The British Virgin Islands Athletics Association (BVIAA) is the governing body for the sport of athletics in the British Virgin Islands.  Current president is Steve Augustine.  He was elected for the first time in 2016.

History 
BVIAA was founded in September 1970 as British Virgin Islands Amateur Athletic Association and was affiliated to the IAAF in March 1972.  "Amateur" was dropped from the association’s name during an Executive Committee meeting on February 10, 2009.

Affiliations 
BVIAA is the national member federation for the British Virgin Islands in the following international organisations:
International Association of Athletics Federations (IAAF)
North American, Central American and Caribbean Athletic Association (NACAC)
Association of Panamerican Athletics (APA)
Central American and Caribbean Athletic Confederation (CACAC)
Leeward Islands Athletics Association (LIAA)
Moreover, it is part of the following national organisations:
British Virgin Islands Olympic Committee (BVIOC)

National records 
BVIAA maintains the British Virgin Islands records in athletics.

External links 
Official Webpage
BVIAA on Facebook

References 

British Virgin Islands
Athletics in the British Virgin Islands
Athletics
1970 establishments in the British Virgin Islands
Sports organizations established in 1970
National governing bodies for athletics